The 2014 Turkmenistan Higher League (Ýokary Liga) season is the 22nd season of Turkmenistan's professional football league. It began on 7 March 2014 with the first round of games and ended in November 2014.

Teams

League table

Results

First half of season

Second half of season

Top goal-scorers
The top scorers are: Updated to match played on 7 March 2014.

Scoring
First goalscorer:
First hat-trick:

References

External links
 Season at soccerway.com
 Official news agency site 

Ýokary Liga seasons
Turk
Turk
1